Mach 3 or variation may refer to:
 Supersonic speed, three times the speed of sound
 M.A.C.H. 3, a 1983 LaserDisc arcade video game
 Mach 3 (1987 video game)
 Fly Castelluccio Mach 3, a paramotor aircraft
 Gillette Mach3, a line of shaving razors
 Kawasaki H1 Mach III, motorcycle
 Abner Jenkins or Mach-3, a Marvel Comics superhero 
 MACH 3, a Wharfedale MACH loudspeaker
 Mach III, a program at the youth camp Aviation Challenge
 Mustang Mach III, a 1990 Ford vehicle
 Mach3 CNC controller from Artsoft Art Fenerty (actually Newfangled)

See also 

 Ford Mach-E, battery electric SUV
 Mach (disambiguation)
 Mach number, 
 Mache (disambiguation)